A geostorm is a geomagnetic storm, a type of weather. Geo storm may also refer to:

 Geo Storm, an automobile
 Geostorm, a 2017 American disaster film
 GunForce II, a 1994 Irem arcade game called Geo Storm in Japan.

See also
 Geo (disambiguation)
 Magnetic storm (disambiguation)
 Storm (disambiguation)
 StormGeo, a weather forecasting company